Fabiana patagonica is a species of plant in the nightshade family, native to Patagonia. This plant species is native to South America.

Synonyms
 Fabiana glandulosa
 Fabiana kurtziana
 Fabiana peckii var. patagonica'

Varieties
 Fabiana patagonica var. brachyloba Fabiana patagonica var. foliosa Fabiana patagonica var. gracilis Fabiana patagonica var. nana Fabiana patagonica var. typica''

References

External links
 GBIF entry
 Sistema de Información sobre Biodiversidad (Argentina)

Petunioideae
Taxa named by Carlo Luigi Spegazzini